Jonathan or Jon Kelly may also refer to:

Jonathan Kelly (oboist) (born 1969), English 
Jonathan Falconbridge Kelly (1817 - c. 1855), American journalist and humorist
Jon Kelly, British audio engineer and record producer
Jon Kelly (swimmer) (born 1965) Canadian butterfly swimmer

See also
John Kelly (disambiguation)